Stejar may refer to:

 Stejar, a village in Vărădia de Mureș Commune, Arad County, Romania
 Stejar, a brand of beer made by SABMiller in Romania
 Stejar (river), a tributary of the Mureș in Arad County, Romania

See also 
 Stejarelul (disambiguation)
 Stejeriș (disambiguation)